The International Physics Olympiad (IPhO) is an annual physics competition for high school students. It is one of the International Science Olympiads.  The first IPhO was held in Warsaw, Poland in 1967.

Each national delegation is made up of at most five student competitors plus two leaders, selected on a national level. Observers may also accompany a national team.  The students compete as individuals, and must sit for intensive theoretical and laboratory examinations. For their efforts the students can be awarded gold, silver, or bronze medals or an honourable mention.

The theoretical examination lasts 5 hours and consists of three questions.  Usually these questions involve more than one part.  The practical examination may consist of one laboratory examination of five hours, or two, which together take up the full five hours.

History 

The idea of creating the International Physics Olympiad was conceived in Eastern Bloc countries, inspired by the 1959 established International Mathematical Olympiad. Poland seemed to offer the best conditions at the time, and so the first IPhO was held in Warsaw in 1967, organized by Prof. Czesław Ścisłowski. Some months prior to the competition, all Central European countries were invited, and the five countries Bulgaria, Czechoslovakia, Hungary, Poland and Romania participated. Each country sent a delegation of three students and one supervisor. Already in this first edition, the competition consisted of two exams, one theoretical and one experimental, and the students went on excursions while their exams were marked.

The second IPhO was held in Hungary, with the additional participation of the German Democratic Republic, the Soviet Union and Yugoslavia. Subsequent editions were carried out in the following years in Czechoslovakia, the Soviet Union, Bulgaria and Romania. At that sixth IPhO in 1972, France joined the competition as the first Western country and Cuba as the first non-European country. With growing size and organizational effort (and no participation fee at that time), no country was willing to arrange an IPhO in 1973. To hold up the competition, Poland volunteered to host another IPhO in 1974, but the problem soon reappeared: With the Federal Republic of Germany, Sweden and Finland, additional Western countries had joined the IPhO, and the Eastern Bloc countries decided in 1977 that they would only host every other IPhO. As the Western countries were not yet ready with the necessary long-term preparation effort, no IPhO was held in 1978 and in 1980. The first Western Country to host the IPhO was the Federal Republic of Germany in 1982. Since then, the IPhO has been held regularly every year except 2020 due to the pandemic, and the organization has become a prestigious endeavor that many countries are happy to take.

The number of participating countries has grown steadily over the years. After the initial set of Eastern Bloc countries, many European countries joined since the 1970s, as well as Asian and American countries starting in the 1980s. Between 1990 and 2000 alone, the total number increased from 32 countries to 63. African countries have been joining since the 2000s. After accession into IPhO, every country must notify the others within five years about its willingness to host the IPhO. The venue of the Olympiad is decided for years ahead. With over 80 actively participating countries today, each IPhO is a big event with around 700 attendees and a total budget of several million euros. A small fraction of the cost is covered by a participation fee of around €3500 per team, which was introduced in 1997 on a voluntary basis and made obligatory in 2013.

The formal structure of the IPhO was established in 1968 at a dedicated meeting in Czechoslovakia, soon after the second IPhO. There the statutes and the syllabus were officially accepted by the International Board, which consists of the delegation heads from all participating countries. The team size was finally set to five students in 1971, and in 1976 the number of experimental problems was set to one or two, while there are three theoretical problems in each competition. In 1984, the IPhO established a permanent secretariat and a president's office. This position was held by Dr. Waldemar Gorzkowski until the 2007 Olympiad, then Prof. Maija Ahtee (2007–2008), Prof. Hans Jordens (2008–2018) and Prof. Rajdeep Singh Rawat (2018 onwards). Since 1984 the IPhO has collaborated with UNESCO for moral support and publicity. An advisory committee, consisting of 14 experienced people, was introduced in 1996.

Distribution of medals 

The minimal scores required for Olympiad medals and honourable mentions are chosen by the organizers according to the following rules: A gold medal should be awarded to the top 8% of the participants. A silver medal or better should be awarded to the top 25%. A bronze medal or better should be awarded to the top 50%. An honourable mention or better should be awarded to the top 67%. All other participants receive certificates of participation. The participant with the highest score (absolute winner) receives a special prize, in addition to a gold medal.

The current ten countries with the best all-time results are as follows as of July 2022:

Summary

In some contests, Taiwan uses Chinese Taipei as their team name.

See also 
International Olympiads in various sciences
International Young Physicists' Tournament (IYPT)
Asian Physics Olympiad
International Olympiad on Astronomy and Astrophysics

References

External links 

 

Physics competitions
International Science Olympiad
Annual events